The 2016 Estonian Figure Skating Championships took place between 11 and 13 December 2015 in Tallinn. Skaters competed in the disciplines of men's singles, ladies' singles, and ice dancing on the senior levels.

Senior results

Men

Ladies

Ice dancing

External links
 2016 Estonian Championships results

Estonian Figure Skating Championships
Figure Skating Championships
Estonian Figure Skating Championships, 2016
2015 in figure skating